WKCT (930 AM) is a News Talk Information–formatted radio station licensed to Bowling Green, Kentucky, United States. The station is owned by the Daily News Broadcasting Company as part of a duopoly with classic rock station WDNS (93.3 FM). Both stations share studios on College Street in downtown Bowling Green, while its transmitter is located along KY 185 adjacent to the Barren River just north of the city. WKCT features programming from CBS News Radio, Compass Media Networks, Premiere Networks and Westwood One.

To complement its AM signal, WKCT operates a translator station on 104.1 FM as W281BV. The translator's transmitter is located along Blue Line Providence Road west of Bowling Green.

History 
The station signed on the air on November 1, 1947, as Bowling Green's second commercial radio station. The station was originally affiliated with ABC Radio. In the early years, while WKCT struggled in terms of listener support, but their commitment to local news and farm news led to the station's news division winning several Associated Press news awards.

The station played an Adult contemporary format, along with at least 10 hours of country music programming per week during the 1970s and 1980s. It then switched to a news/talk format at some point before 1990.

WKCT on the FM dial
On January 23, 2017, WKCT signed on a new FM translator to broadcast on a 24-hour basis. W281BV broadcasts WKCT's night programming at 104.1 Megahertz on the FM dial for the purpose of providing its nightly schedule, because WKCT is required to power down at sunset under the FCC-approved license, and in order to avoid interference with other AM signals broadcasting at 930 kHz.

“Talk 104.1 FM” is the overall tenth commercial low-powered FM repeater in the Bowling Green/Glasgow radio market. It also makes WKCT the third AM radio station in the immediate Bowling Green area simulcasting radio programming on an FM repeater after ESPN Radio station WWKU and Fox Sports Radio affiliate turned Classic country station WBGN.

Programming 
The station is now affiliated with CBS Radio and broadcasts all of that network's hourly newscasts. The station also broadcasts Bowling Green High School Football and Greenwood High School football games. Syndicated radio shows on the station include those of Kentucky Sports Radio, Sean Hannity, and Dave Ramsey.

Beginning in April 2022, WKCT became the radio broadcast home to the Bowling Green Hot Rods of Minor League Baseball. They were originally broadcast on WBGN for the team's first 12 years in Bowling Green.

Translator
WKCT operates a FM translator for the immediate Bowling Green area:

References

External links

       

KCT
Mass media in Bowling Green, Kentucky
Radio stations established in 1947